ʽAlman, also ʽUlman, is a village in Bani al-Harith District of Amanat al-Asimah Governorate, Yemen. It is located on the northern side of the lower end of the Wadi Dahr.

History 
According to the 10th-century writer al-Hamdani, ʽAlman was negatively affected by the collapse of the Rayʽan dam in 859; it had previously been under extensive cultivation, but after the dam collapsed the water supply dwindled. References by historical writers also indicate that ʽAlman may have been the site of a pre-Islamic palace.

See also 
 Qaryat al-Qabil, the main village in the area, just to the southwest

References 

Villages in Sanaa Governorate